Italy competed at the 2009 Mediterranean Games held in Pescara, Italy.

Athletics

Men

Women

See also
Italy at the Mediterranean Games

External links
Mediterranean Games

Nations at the 2009 Mediterranean Games
2009
Mediterranean